Pelargoderus stellatus is a species of beetle in the family Cerambycidae. It was described by Vitali and Casadio in 2007. It is known from the Solomon Islands.

References

stellatus
Beetles described in 2007